The IHF Inter-Continental Trophy has been organized by the International Handball Federation since 2011. It is a biennial tournament played among emerging nations in under-21 (junior) and under-19 (youth) categories.

Men's junior tournament

Summary

Medal table

Participating nations

Men's youth tournament

Summary

Participating nations

Women's tournament

Summary

Medal table

Participating nations

References

External links
 Summary of Tournaments on Official Website
 Summary of Tournaments on Todor Krastev

 
International handball competitions
Recurring sporting events established in 2011
Intercontinental